

The Letov Š-39 was a sport aircraft produced in Czechoslovakia during the 1930s. It was a conventional, parasol-wing monoplane with fixed tailskid undercarriage, and seating for the pilot and passenger in tandem, open cockpits. Because the cabane struts were very short, and the wing therefore placed very close to the top of the fuselage, the cockpits had the unusual arrangement of the passenger's being in front of the wing while the pilot's was behind it. The outer half of each wing was fitted with fixed slats along the leading edge. An initial batch of 23 machines was built for use by Czech aeroclubs. These were followed by batches of aircraft with alternative powerplants.

Variants

Š-39
Prototype with Orion LL-50 engine followed by production batch with Walter Polaris engines
Š-139
Production model with Pobjoy R engine and Townend ring
Š-239
Production model with Walter Minor 4 engine

Specifications (Š-39)

References

 
 

1930s Czechoslovakian sport aircraft
Letov aircraft
Parasol-wing aircraft
Single-engined tractor aircraft
Aircraft first flown in 1931